Auto-segregation or self-segregation is the separation of a religious, ethnic, or racial group from other groups in a country by the group itself naturally. This usually results in decreased social interactions between different ethnic, racial or religious groups and can be classed as a form of social exclusion.

Through self-segregation, the members of the separate group can establish their own services, and maintain their own traditions and customs. For example, some of the world's uncontacted peoples have preferred not to interact with the rest of the globally integrated human population. By remaining in a reserve and in isolation, they can preserve their cultures intact as long as they choose and the surrounding states protect them.

A modern form of self-segregation occurring in prominent Western countries for example is influenced by White demographic decline however this is not the only example and can also be found in heterogeneous ethnically and religiously diverse countries in South and Southeast Asia, for example Malaysia and India.

Recurring patterns in countries affected by self-segregation

Residential segregation 
As self-segregation begins to appear, residents of different ethnic, racial or religious background begin to separate from each other and live in different areas in large concentrations.

Rural and urban divide 
In some countries affected by self-segregation, there exists a divide among racial groups in rural areas and in urban areas of a country. This trend is most commonly seen in countries affected by White demographic decline and is usually an occurrence of white flight from inner city areas and then outer city suburbs as these places become more ethnically diverse and heterogeneous to more whiter rural areas.

School segregation 
Typically as segregation begins to appear schools end up becoming segregated on ethnic and religious lines.

Ethnic communalism 

Self-segregation and segregation in general usually lead's to inter-ethnic violence between different ethnic, racial or religious groups. Instances of this can be seen worldwide in places which have a degree of ethnic or religious diversity within them, famous examples of this are the Troubles and sectarian conflict in Iraq between Sunnis and Shia's and general religiously motivated riots in South Asia and Africa, especially in India and Nigeria.

Self-segregation in countries

India 
In India, religious self-segregation exists between mainly the Hindu majority in the country and the large Muslim minority.

Sweden 
According to researcher Emma Neuman at Linnaeus University, segregation sets in at population share around 3-4% of non-European migrants in a district, while European immigration shows no such trend. The study comprised the 12 largest municipalities of Sweden for the period 1990–2007. High income earners and highly educated move out of non-European migrant districts first where ethnic segregation in turn leads to social segregation.

A study at Örebro University concluded that while Swedish parents stated positive views towards the values of multiculturalism, in practice they still chose Swedish-majority schools for their offspring so their children won't be an ethnic minority during their formative years and to get a good environment to develop their native Swedish language.

United Kingdom 
Self-segregation in the United Kingdom has been increasing in recent decades as the White British population has declined overall nationally, increasing in the years between 2001 to 2011 as immigration has increased to the country and the speed of demographic decline for the White British has sped up. In large towns and cities for example the White population has largely began migrating out of ethnically diverse heterogeneous urban areas and have begun to self-segregate in whiter rural areas. Muslim migrants to the country also have high rates of endogamy, for example it is estimated that around 55% of British Pakistanis are married to their first cousins. These groups typically segregate away from other ethnic and religious groups via the use of religious faith schools. For example, in the London Borough of Tower Hamlets in the East End, around 60% of White students in the Borough attend White majority schools while 17 primary schools had more than 90% Bangladeshi pupils while 9 schools had less than 10%.

Calls for action against this trend have increased in volume since the 2001 race riots in Bradford and Oldham, where racial segregation is present as well. The Cantle Report of 2001 outlined that different communities were living 'parallel lives' which advocated for 'community cohesion' strategies to promote integration. The Casey Report in 2016, which preceded after the Cantle Report fifteen years prior suggested a similar outlook to the previous report that segregation was still at 'worrying levels'.

London 
In London, self-segregation is increasing overall between different ethnic and religious groups which live in the city.

Bradford 
In Bradford, self-segregation between the prominent Muslim minority in the city and the White British population exists at large and was a factor behind the race riots in 2001.

United States
Self-segregation is on the increase in the United States, being mostly influenced by White demographic decline in the country which is more prevalent than in other white-majority societies worldwide (57% of the country as of 2020 is Non-Hispanic White). In 2018, research by the University of Illinois and sociologist Mary Krysan found that while Whites, Blacks and Hispanics in America stated that the ideal neighbourhood that they liked was racially diverse, most ended up living in neighbourhoods in which their racial group was the majority. However, this differed from racial group to racial group on how much of a percentage their racial group represented in their neighbourhood. While Hispanics (51% Hispanic) and Blacks (66% Black) ended up living in areas in which they were a majority, their proportional amount was significantly lower than that of whites. (74% white).

Endogamy as self-segregation

Endogamy, the practice of marrying within a group, encourages group affiliation and bonding. It is a common practice among displanted cultures attempting to make roots in new countries whilst still resisting complete integration, as it encourages group solidarity and ensures greater control over group resources (which may be important to preserve when a group is attempting to establish itself within an alien culture).

However endogamy can also serve as a form of self-segregation and helps a community to resist integrating with surrounding populations. It thus helps minorities to survive as separate communities over a long time, in societies with other practices and beliefs.

Examples of ethno-religious groups with higher levels of endogamy that have successfully resisted cultural destruction and assimilation for centuries are the Romani (colloquially referred to by non-members as "Gypsies"), the Ashkenazi Jews of Europe and the Americas and the Afrikaners of South Africa.

See also

 Freedom of association
 Consociationalism
 Defection
 Endogamy
 Ethnocentrism
 Hypersegregation
 Isolationism
 Parallel society
 Secession
 Separatism
 White flight

Books:
 The Shame of the Nation: The Restoration of Apartheid Schooling in America

References

Politics and race
Racial segregation
Ethnicity
Cultural geography
Sociology of culture
Social concepts
Segregation
Demographics